Events from the year 1998 in South Korea.

Incumbents
President: Kim Young-sam (until 24 February), Kim Dae-jung (starting 24 February)
Prime Minister: Goh Kun (until 3 March), Kim Jong-pil (starting 3 March)

Events

July 12: North Korean Raider incident, one frogman found dead on a beach at Donghae on South Korea's east coast.
June 22: 1998 Sokcho submarine incident
August 5 Korean Air Flight 8702
August 31: 1998 North Korean missile test
17/18 December: 1998 Yeosu submersible incident

Undated
Gremiphyca genus is reinvestigated by Xiao et al.
1998 South Korea Flood is the 3rd deadliest in South Korean history.
Mount Kumgang Tourist Region opened for tourists.

Births
 January 16 – Seungkwan, singer in boy group Seventeen
 January 25 – Cho Gue-sung, footballer
 January 26 – Chanwoo, singer in boy group iKon
 January 26 – Moon Bin, member of boy group ASTRO
 February 5 – Hyunjoo, member of girl group April
 February 18 – Vernon, member of boy group Seventeen
 March 9 – Soojin, member of girl group (G)I-dle
 May 6 – Hwanhee, singer in boy group UP10TION
 May 27 – Son Ju-yeon, member of girl group Cosmic Girls
 May 28 – Kim Dahyun, member of girl group Twice
 June 3 – SinB, member of girl group GFriend and VIVIZ
 August 10 – Jang Ye-eun, member of girl group CLC
 August 19 –Umji, member of girl group GFriend and VIVIZ
 August 26 – Jeon So-yeon, songwriter, record producer, singer, and rapper in girl group (G)I-dle
 December 13 – Xiao, singer in boy group UP10TION

See also
1998 in South Korean music
List of South Korean films of 1998
Years in Japan
Years in North Korea

References

 
South Korea
Years of the 20th century in South Korea
1990s in South Korea
South Korea